Judit Varga (born 12 January 1979 in Győr) is an Erkel Ferenc Prize and Béla Bartók - Ditta Pásztory Award winner composer, pianist and university lecturer.

She is known for contemporary classical music compositions as well as for composing for motion pictures and theatre pieces. As a solo pianist and chamber musician, she performed in many countries, on prestigious festivals. She is looking for new impulses both as a musician and as a teacher. The two primary platforms of her studies and work are Vienna and Budapest.

Life 
She started her studies at the Liszt Ferenc Music School in Győr, where she played the piano and the flute. She then attended the Béla Bartók School in Budapest. At the age of 16, she has already received scholarships to foreign summer courses. In 2005 she graduated with honors at the Franz Liszt Academy of Music, where she studied piano and composition. In the meantime she was admitted to the University of Music and Performing Arts Vienna too, to the media composition and applied music, piano and composition faculties, and since 2013 she is a PhD student there.

Since September 2013 she is teaching composition and film music composition at the composition department of the Liszt Ferenc Academy of Music, while at the University of Music and Performing Arts in Vienna she teaches ear training and analysis to the students of the composition and conducting departments.

At the beginning of the 2000s, she used to be a tutor of the singer, string and flute classes of the Austrian Master Classes in Zell an der Pram and of their master classes in Vienna. At the Richter János High School of Music in Győr she was teaching composition, score reading, music theory and orchestration. In 2008 she led the piano class of the Maria Regina Volksschule in Vienna and she was a silent film pianist as well.

Her compositions are performed worldwide in such prestigious concert halls and festivals as the Wien Modern, the Hungarian State Opera House, the Philharmonie de Paris, the Juilliard School in New York, the CAFe Budapest Contemporary Arts Festival, the Mini Festival, the Konzerthaus and Musikverein Wien, the Muffathalle Munich and the Warsaw Autumn. They are part of the repertoire of Hungarian and foreign bands like the Ensemble Modern, the BBC Symphony Orchestra, the Vienna Radio Symphony Orchestra, the Hungarian State Opera Orchestra, the UMZE Ensemble, the Concerto Budapest, the Ensemble Kontrapunkte, the Riot Ensemble London, the ensemble XX. jahrhundert (eXXj) and the Hungarian Radio Choir. All of her compositions were commissioned.

She performed on many stages all around the world as a solo pianist and chamber musician. In 2016 her opera, Love, which is an adaptation of the classic film of Tibor Déry, Károly Makk and Péter Bacsó, debuted in the Hungarian State Opera House as part of the memorial year of the Hungarian Revolution of 1956. In 2019 she was awarded with the TONALi19 composer award for her piano solo, Pendulum. This also means that said composition will be performed by the participants of the piano competition of the TONALi Festival in the Elbphilharmonie.

Beside contemporary classical music, she is particularly interested in scoring motion pictures and theatre pieces, and in the compositions written for multimedia events. In 2013, when the Prima Primissima Prize has undergone a complete renewal, she was entrusted to design the new musical image. She composed music for more than 30 theatre pieces and films. In 2014 the Academy of Austrian Film awarded best soundtrack to Deine Schönheit ist nichts Wert (Your Beauty is Worth Nothing...). In autumn, the Konzerthaus of Vienna commissioned her to compose new music score for a Bolshevik Soviet propaganda silent film from 1924, The Extraordinary Adventures of Mr. West in the Land of the Bolsheviks. The renewed film premiered in March 2016. Approximately 30% of her work is made up of composing for films.
	
She is a member of the Hungarian Composers’ Union, the Austrian Composers’ Association and the Studio 5 composer group. The latter was founded in 2017 and they aim to organize concerts that can bridge tradition and innovation.

Main works

Operas

Orchestral works

Ensemble

Chamber music

Vocal music

Solo Instrument

Film Scores

Dance Theatre Music

Theatre Music

Discography

Awards 
 1st prize – Franz Liszt Academy of Music (LFZE) Composer Competition, Budapest (1998)
 1st prize – LFZE Composer Competition, Budapest (1999)
 SKE Special Award – Social and cultural support from austro mechana - SKE Fonds, Vienna (2003)
 2st prize – LFZE Composer Competition, Budapest (2003)
 2st prize – LFZE Composer Competition, Budapest (2004)
 Special Award – Liszt Ferenc International Piano Competition, Pécs (2005)
 Dryard Prize – Vienna International Pianists Academy, Vienna (2006)
 Theodor Körner Prize (2009)
 1st prize, Orchestra category – UMZF Composer Competition, Budapest (2009)
 State scholarship – BMUKK (Bundesministerium für Unterricht, Kunst und Kultur), Vienna (2010)
 2st prize, Orchestra category – New Hungarian Music Forum (UMZF) Composer Competition, Budapest (2011)
 Special Award – Ö1 Talentebörse-Kompositionspreis, Vienna (2012)
 Winner of the „Woher? Wohin? Mythen, Nation, Identitäten“ tender – Goethe-Institut, Ensemble Modern, Frankfurt (2012)
 Film Prize nominee, Best Soundtrack – 49. International Antalya Film Festival (2012)
 Film Prize nominee, Best Soundtrack – Austrian Film Academy (2013)
 Staatsstipendium – BMUKK (Bundesministerium für Unterricht, Kunst und Kultur), Vienna (2014)
 Film Prize, Best Soundtrack – Austrian Film Academy (Deine Schönheit ist nichts Wert, 2014)
 Winner of the Hungarian State Opera House's tender for the 60th anniversary of the Hungarian Revolution of 1956., Budapest (Love, 2016)
 Bartók Béla–Pásztory Ditta Prize (2017)
 „Call for scores” winner of the Riot Ensemble (Broken Beauty, 2018)
 Erkel Ferenc Prize (2018)
 Istvánffy Benedek Prize (Pocket Requiem, 2018)
 TONALi Prize – Tonali Classical Music Competition and Festival (Pendulum, 2019)

References

 
 
 Judit Varga, Budapest Music Center, info.bmc.hu
 Judit Varga, Music Information Center Austria (mica) Music Database, db.musicaustria.at
 Judit Varga in Teaching Staff, Liszt Academy, lfze.hu

External links
 YouTube Profile of Judit Varga
 Andrea Kolozsvári: Varga Judit és Takács-Nagy Gábor kapta a Bartók-Pásztory-díjat (Judit Varga and Gábor Takács-Nagy have been awarded the Bartók-Pásztory Prize), musicianswho.hu – 28 March 2017. (In Hungarian)
 Visitenkarte von Judit Varga Mag.art. MDWonline - University of Music and Performing Arts Vienna, (28 March 2019.) (In German)
 Author: Judit Varga, International experiences at & with the mdw – University of Music and Performing Arts Vienna (28 March 2019.) (In German)
 http://studio5-music.com

1979 births
Hungarian composers
Hungarian women pianists
Living people
People from Győr
Women classical pianists